, is a Japanese visual novel created by Idea Factory directed at the female market, known as an otome game. Released on July 6, 2006 for the PlayStation 2, the protagonist is a teenage girl who revisits a small village she remembers from her childhood and gets caught up in her family's history and supernatural dangers surrounding it. A thirteen episode anime adaptation by Studio Deen aired in Japan between April 1, 2012 and June 24, 2012 and was licensed in North America by Sentai Filmworks. A second season, aired between October 1, 2012 and December 23, 2012. Some characters from this property are featured in the PSP game B's LOG Party, released on May 20, 2010.

Gameplay

Plot
Tamaki Kasuga is a teenage girl who revisits a small village she remembers from her childhood and gets caught up in her family's history and the supernatural dangers surrounding it. While walking along the hillsides waiting for the person who her grandmother sent to fetch Tamaki to the village, Tamaki comes across a small, white round object which has sticks for limbs and can talk. It runs off soon after with Tamaki chasing after it. Soon Tamaki finds herself in a place where it does not feel like the world she came from. She gets attacked by three slime creatures, and a mysterious man comes charging in to save her tells her to be quiet. After the young man, recognized as Takuma Onizaki, saves her, he walks her to the village where her grandmother is staying. Soon after her arrival she meets with her grandmother. It is later explained that she has to continue the role of the ancestor Tamayori Princess to seal the sword Onikirimaru with the help of her five Guardians.

Characters

Main characters

The main protagonist of the series, though her name is changeable in the PS2 and DS version. Tamaki is the next Tamayori Princess after her grandmother, Shizuki. She is very connected with, and can sense through, her body whenever something happens to the Onikirimaru seals. When she first comes to the village, she has no idea what was going on. But as the story progresses, she gets used to all the unusual things happening around her. She is known to have strong faith even when the situation appears hopeless. Near the end of the series, she finally awakens completely as the new Tamayori Princess, and is able to put a stop to the sacrificing and the Onikirimaru. The new power associated with the Tamayori Princess grants her several abilities such as self-defense and barrier formation. She is saved by Takuma as soon as she arrives, but starts hating him because of his attitude toward her. They then end up being in the same class as each other. When she meets all five Guardians, she is not accepted much because she was "useless", and they grew up as tools who live only to protect her. But later in the story she is accepted by the five Guardians after showing she truly cares for them. She later falls in love with Takuma, and discovers they were lovers in their past life, in which he promised to become one of her Guardians in their current life, which he did. She is also the only one who can stop Takuma's power from taking over his body. She states her hobby is visiting shrines and temples.

The main hero of the series and the first of the Guardians to meet Tamaki. Takuma does not accept her at first, and shows a cold attitude towards her. He later finds out they are to be classmates. Although he is annoyed with Tamaki at first, he grows to accept her, and even falls in love with her. He has powerful strength, and finds out he is the descendant of the oni, whose power is very hard to control, especially when near the sealed magical sword Onikirimaru. At times, the power inside of him starts to take over, but he becomes himself again when Tamaki is with him. His hobby is doing crosswords and he likes eating taiyaki. It is revealed that he is actually the reincarnation of the Underworld God, and was Tamaki's lover in their past life.

An upperclassman of the main character and one of the five Guardians. Mahiro is the descendant of the raven and can control the wind. He is extremely self-conscious when it comes to his height, because although he is older than most of them, he is the shortest. He is usually very loud, energetic, short-tempered and sometimes immature. He is not afraid to say what he feels, however he can show a serious and deep side when needed. He likes women with big breasts and loves motorbikes, and yakisoba sandwiches. At the beginning, he disliked Tamaki because he thought he was just her tool. There were several instances where he took his anger out on her. Later, however, he sees that she truly cares about his and the others' well-being. He grows fond and protective of her. Throughout the series, there are hints that he may be in love with her, but he accepts Tamaki and Takuma's relationship because he feels that Takuma is the only one meant to be with her.

An upperclassman of the main character and another of the five Guardians. Yuichi is the descendant of the nine-tailed fox and specializes in using illusions and spirit fire. He is very quiet and can be emotionless. He can be found a lot of the times in the library, usually reading a book. He likes spacing out and has the ability to sleep anywhere at any time. His hobby is just relaxing and laying on the grass in the sun.

Unofficial leader of the Guardians and descendant of the giant snake. Suguru is the tactician of the group and can also create powerful seals and barriers and also controls water. He is very polite and reliable but has a childish side, usually seen smiling. He loves drinking tea and teaching calligraphy. He has a strong dislike for Drei, but still keeps himself in line. Because his mother, a Tamayori Princess, was sacrificed, he is strongly against the sacrifice tradition.

He is the youngest of the Guardians and is a grade below Tamaki and Takuma. Shinji has the power of restoration and can use the power of words to control things. It is hinted that he and Mitsuru were close before he went away and were possibly in love, although not much about their relationship is revealed. His hobby is his excellent skills in cooking. It is revealed that he was giving information to Logos and later finds out that he is the twin to Mitsuru in the second season. He is formerly named Fünf from Logos when he was a child.

He is in the same year as Tamaki and Takuma, but he is actually one year older than them. He is a lone wolf and does as he pleases. He has a penchant for sniffing Tamaki, which is due to his powers. It is later revealed that he is actually a member of the Inukai household, who would have been the Inukai Guardian, however his mother hid his existence.

Logos

A young girl with long blonde hair and blue eyes. Aria believes that she is the sacred maiden blessed by God. She can neutralize all magical attacks and bless spirits. Aria speaks in an adult-like manner but sometimes acts like a child, though in denial of acting like one.

 / Leif Helluland

An aide to Aria and his codename is one in German. Eins has super strength and specializes in close range combat. He is very protective of Aria and is connected to her. He died protecting her from Drei.

 / Hugo Stingrail

An aide to Aria and his codename is two in German. Zwei fights with a scythe and likes to eat his opponents' souls. Mahiro calls him "death-god".

 / Magus Melchizedek

An aide to Aria and his codename is three in German. Drei is a magician and can summon dark spirits to fight. He is not the original Drei. He is very interested in research and regards his opponents as potential research subjects. His loyalty to Logos is unsure and a mystery. He is later revealed to be one of the four Wisemen of Logos.

An aide to Aria and her codename is four in German. Vier was the only one chosen by Aria herself out of all the subordinates. She is a skilled tactician, and an alias for Fiona. She poses as a teacher named Fiona. She reminds Suguru of his mother but is actually a clone of Suguru's mother created by the four Wisemen.

An aide to Aria and his codename is five in German. Fünf is the alias for Shinji.

Others

The grandmother of Tamaki. Shizuki is the previous Tamayori Princess before bestowing that title onto Tamaki. She tasks Tamaki with the responsibility of protecting the Onikirimaru seals.

A girl that works at the shrine. Mitsuru is very polite, and she can appear emotionless and doll-like. She is also a very good cook and is good at housework. She has the power to create invisible barriers. Tamaki, when caught in her barrier at one point, comments that it feels like mizuame. She seems to have feelings for Shinji, but in the second season it turns out that she is Shinji's twin sister.

 / 

A kitsune that Tamaki receives and can be named by the player. O-chan ravels in Tamaki's shadows and comes out at her calling. It likes curling up and sleeping in warm places.

A mysterious man that Tamaki and the Guardians meet early on at the shrine and Kiyono's boss. Ashiya says he is a businessman. He is interested in reading palms and faces. He loves eating rice crackers.

A classmate of Tamaki that befriends her. Kiyono makes money from making straw voodoo dolls. In the second season, it is revealed that she works with Ashiya, as he is not her uncle. She is actually 23, despite looking younger.

The English teacher at Tamaki's school. Fiona has long blonde hair and looks like she comes from Hollywood, while appearing to be of German origin. Her true form is Vier from Logos.

Development and release
Hiiro no Kakera was developed by Idea Factory and released on July 6, 2006 for the PlayStation 2 (PS2) as the first in the Hiiro no Kakera series.

 was released for the PS2 on October 1, 2009 and was later ported to the PSP on September 30, 2010.  was the first game in the series released on the PlayStation 3 (PS3) on May 26, 2011.  followed on the PSP on July 14, 2011.  was released for the PSP on May 17, 2012. , set in the Heian period unlike the rest of the installments, was released also for the PSP on September 20, 2012. A fandisc for the 4th game has been announced.

Anime
A thirteen episode anime television series adaptation aired between April 1, 2012 and June 24, 2012. The series is directed by Bob Shirohata and produced by Studio Deen. Both themes were released as singles by Lantis in 2012. A second season, aired between October 1, 2012 and December 23, 2012. Both seasons were streamed on Crunchyroll.

Episode list

Hiiro no Kakera

Hiiro no Kakera: Dai Ni Shō

References

External links
Anime official website 

2006 video games
2012 anime television series debuts
Anime television series based on video games
Japan-exclusive video games
Nintendo DS games
Otome games
PlayStation 2 games
PlayStation Portable games
Romance video games
Sentai Filmworks
Studio Deen
Visual novels
Video games developed in Japan
Yōkai in anime and manga
Idea Factory games